Belenois antsianaka is a butterfly in the family Pieridae. It is found on Madagascar. The habitat consists of forest margins and unnatural grassland.

References

Butterflies described in 1870
Pierini
Butterflies of Africa
Taxa named by Christopher Ward (entomologist)